The Roman Catholic Diocese of Chaozhou/Shíuchow/Shaoguan is a diocese located in the city of Chaozhou in the Ecclesiastical province of Guangzhou in China.

History
 April 9, 1920: Established as the Apostolic Vicariate of Siuchow 韶州 from the Apostolic Vicariate of Guangzhou 廣州
 April 11, 1946: Promoted as Diocese of Siuchow/Shaozhou 韶州

(Chaozhou is exactly another city in Guangdong Province, based on the current Chinese pinyin system)

Leadership
 Bishops of Chaozhou 韶州 (Roman rite)
 Bishop Michele Alberto Arduino, S.D.B. (April 9, 1948 – October 21, 1962)
 Bishop Ignazio Canazei, S.D.B. (April 11, 1946 – October 12, 1946)
 Vicars Apostolic of Siuchow 韶州 (Roman Rite)
 Bishop Ignazio Canazei, S.D.B. (July 24, 1930 – April 11, 1946)
 Saint Bishop Luigi Versiglia, S.D.B. (April 22, 1920 – February 25, 1930)

References

 GCatholic.org
 Catholic Hierarchy

1920 establishments in China
Christianity in Guangdong
Christian organizations established in 1920
Roman Catholic dioceses and prelatures established in the 20th century
Roman Catholic dioceses in China
Shaoguan